The 1906 Vermont gubernatorial election took place on September 4, 1906. In keeping with the Republican Party's "Mountain Rule", incumbent Republican Charles J. Bell, did not run for a second term as Governor of Vermont. At the start of the year, Percival W. Clement and Fletcher D. Proctor were the leading candidates for the Republican nomination.  When it became clear that Proctor had the support of the delegates, Clement ended his campaign for the nomination.  He filed as an Independent candidate for the general election and was subsequently endorsed by the Democratic Party.  In the general election, Proctor easily defeated Clement.

Results

References

Vermont
1906
Gubernatorial
September 1906 events